Jon Stuart Goodwin (born 16 June 1943) is a British retired slalom canoeist who competed in the early 1970s. He was a competitor in the C-2 event at the 1972 Summer Olympics in Munich.
He has been a regular and leading competitor in the Ferrari Hillclimb Championship since 1992, winning in 2000 and 2008, and has more Class wins than any other competitor (as at end 2020 season). His wife Pauline Goodwin also competes.

References
Sports-reference.com profile

1943 births
Canoeists at the 1972 Summer Olympics
Living people
Olympic canoeists of Great Britain
British male canoeists